Sardar Raja Mahan Singh Mirpuri Bali (born in Mirpur, Kashmir) was a famous general in the Sikh Khalsa Army, and was the second-in-command general to General Sardar Hari Singh Nalwa. He was conferred by Maharaja Ranjit Singh the title of Raja for his conquests of Haripur, Nowshera and Peshawar. The town of Mansehra derives its name from him.

Early life

Mahan Singh was born in Mirpur in the Kashmir region of India into a Hindu (Saraswat) Mohyal Brahmin family of the Bali clan (Parāśara  gotra). He was the son of Data Ram Bali, who was a counselor to Sultan Raja Muqqarab Khan, the muslim Gakhar Subedar of the Punjabi cities of Gujrat, Jhelum, and Rawalpindi. Mahan Singh Mirpuri, born a Brahmin Hindu, took amrit and became a Khalsa Sikh.

Military career and later Life

While in Lahore in search of a job, he happened to participate in a hunting expedition of Maharaja Ranjit Singh, in which he caught the notice of the Maharaja by single-handedly killing a leopard with his sword. Impressed by his valor, the Maharaja had him inducted into the army under the famous General Hari Singh Nalwa.

Mahan Singh Mirpuri played a key role in the battles of Peshawar and Kashmir, and in the 1818 siege of Multan, where he was seriously wounded two times. He went on to become second-in-command to Hari Singh Nalwa. In April 1837, he was the main defender of the Jamrud Fort, holding out against an invasion by the Afghans. In the Battle of Jamrud, Hari Singh Nalwa was killed but Mahan Singh maintained the news secret until reinforcements arrived from Lahore.

Mai Desan, the widow of Hari Singh Nalwa, adopted Mahan Singh as her son and solemnized his marriage into a fellow Mohyal Brahmins family of the Mohan clan (Kashyapa gotra) from Gujranwala according to Hindu Vedic traditions.

Mahan Singh had four sons, named Chhattar Singh, Himmat Singh, Sham Singh and Wadhwa Singh.

Death 

Sardar Raja Mahan Singh was murdered by his own soldiers in 1844, when mutiny broke out in the Sikh Khalsa Army.

His death at the hands of mutinying soldiers was avenged by Chhattar Singh (His Son), who was himself killed soon after.

See also
 Maharaja Ranjit Singh's Generals
 Mansehra

References

Indian generals
People from Mansehra District
Punjabi people
Converts to Sikhism from Hinduism
Indian Sikhs
1844 deaths
People of the Sikh Empire
Assassinated Indian people
Assassinated military personnel
1810 births